Matt Miller (born May 1, 1991) is an American football coach who is currently the wide receivers coach at Boise State University. He was previously the offensive coordinator and quarterbacks coach at Montana State University.

Early life and playing career 
A native of Helena, Montana, Miller was a three-sport star at Capital High School. His athleticism caught the attention of then-Arkansas head coach Bobby Petrino, a Capital High alumni and former teammate of Miller's father. A highly touted recruit, he received offers to play college football from schools such as Oregon, Oregon State, and Boise State and also received offers to play college basketball at Montana and Montana State. He committed to playing college football at Boise State on Christmas Day in 2009.

At Boise State, Miller redshirted the 2010 season after tearing an Achilles tendon in fall camp. As a redshirt freshman, Miller set single season freshman records for the program including receptions (62), receiving yards (679), and receiving touchdowns (9) en route to freshman All-America honors in 2011. By the time his college career ended in 2014, Miller was Boise State's career leader in receptions and second all-time in receiving yards. Miller had a professional tryout with the Denver Broncos before injuries ended his playing career.

Coaching career 
After his playing career ended, Miller spent 2015 at Boise State as an offensive quality control coach. He was hired as the receivers coach at Montana State in 2016 and added the title of recruiting coordinator in 2017. He was promoted to offensive coordinator and reassigned to quarterbacks coach midway through the 2018 season, and held that role for the 2019 season as well.

Miller returned to his alma mater Boise State in 2020 as their wide receivers coach and passing game coordinator.

Personal life 
Miller is married to the former Sarah Baugh, a former standout volleyball player at Boise State.

References

External links 
 Boise State Broncos bio
 Montana State Bobcats bio

1991 births
Living people
Sportspeople from Helena, Montana
Players of American football from Montana
Boise State Broncos football players
American football wide receivers
Boise State Broncos football coaches
Montana State Bobcats football coaches